Serbia competed at the 2012 European Athletics Championships held in Helsinki, Finland, between 27 June to 1 July 2012. At the championship in Helsinki, Serbia was represented by 11 athletes (7 men and 4 women) who competed in 8 disciplines.

In addition to the silver medal, Emir Bekrić set a new national record of 49.37 seconds in the semifinal for the 400m hurdles event.

Looking at the overall medal ranking, Serbia shared 20th place with Lithuania with one silver and one bronze medal.

Medals

Results

Men
Track events

Field events

Combined

Women
Track events

Field events

References

 

Serbia at the European Athletics Championships
Nations at the 2012 European Athletics Championships
2012 in Serbian sport